Tim Meamber (born October 29, 1962) is a former professional American football linebacker for the Minnesota Vikings in the National Football League (NFL).  He played college football at the University of Washington and was a member of the 11-1 1984 team who beat Oklahoma in the Orange Bowl. He finished his career at Washington as a team captain.

See also
 Washington Huskies football statistical leaders

References

External links
  
  
  
 

1962 births
Living people
People from Yreka, California
American football linebackers
Washington Huskies football players
Minnesota Vikings players
Players of American football from California